Aleksander Surdej (born 1961) is a Polish economist and scientist who serves as an permanent representative to the Organisation for Economic Co-operation and Development since 19 August 2016. His research interests focus on the methodology of policy analysis, labour market policies and policies of social regulations.

Life 
Aleksander Surdej has graduated from international economics at the Kraków University of Economics as well as sociology at the Jagiellonian University. He completed an International Studies program at Johns Hopkins University SAIS, Ph.D. program at the European University Institute (EUI) in Florence and a research fellow there, was twice a fellow of Salzburg Global Seminar, World Institute for Development Economics Research in Helsinki and Netherlands Institute for Advanced Study in Wassenaar. He defended his Ph.D. in 1995 at Jagiellonian University and acquired post-doctoral degree in 2006.

Since 2007 he worked as a professor of economics at the Kraków University of Economics as the head of the Department of European Studies.

He is an author and editor of 14 books and more than 70 articles related to international economics published in Polish and international scientific journals.

Aleksander Surdej was collaborating with the Wim Kok group in the 2002 analysis of the consequences of EU enlargement, the World Bank and the Polish government. He has coordinated and participated in more than dozen international research projects. He has been also cooperating with Adam Smith Centre.

He speaks English, French, Italian and Russian.

Aleksander Surdej is married to Irena Surdej with four children.

Works 

 Small- and medium-sized development in Poland after 1990, Helsinki: WIDER, 2000.
 Determinanty regulacji administracyjnoprawnych w oddziaływaniu państwa na gospodarkę, Wydawnictwo Akademii Ekonomicznej w Krakowie, Kraków, 2006, .
 Managing Ownership and Succession in Family Firms [ed. with Krzysztof Wach], Warszawa: Difin, 2010, .
 Exploring the dynamics of entrepreneurship [ed. with Krzysztof Wach], Toruń; Kraków: Wydawnictwo Adam Marszałek, 2010, .
 Succession Choices in Family Businesses. The Case of Poland [ed. with Krzysztof Wach], Toruń; Kraków: Wydawnictwo Adam Marszałek, 2011.
 Analiza ekonomiczna w polityce publicznej [ed.], Warszawa: Wydawnictwo Naukowe Scholar, 2012, .
 Wprowadzenie do problematyki globalnych reżimów regulacyjnych [ed. with Jan Brzozowski], Toruń: Wydawnictwo Adam Marszałek, 2012, .
 Ewaluacja w polityce publicznej [ed.], Warszawa: Difin, 2013, .
 Terytorializacja lub funkcjonalizacja: dylematy ugrupowań integracyjnych [ed. with Jan Brzozowski], Toruń: Wydawnictwo Adam Marszałek, 2013, .
 Economic Challenges for Higher Education in Central and Eastern Europe [ed. with Marcin Kędzierski], Toruń: Wydawnictwo Adam Marszałek, 2015, .
 Tożsamość i efektywność: w poszukiwaniu mechanizmów zrównoważonego rozwoju [with Katarzyna Jarecka-Stępień], Toruń: Wydawnictwo Adam Marszałek, 2016, .

References

External links 

 Official website
 Blog

1961 births
Ambassadors of Poland to the Organisation for Economic Co-operation and Development
Jagiellonian University alumni
Kraków University of Economics alumni
Academic staff of the Kraków University of Economics
Living people
Polish economists